Michael Odisho is an Assyrian-Australian  underworld figure and former member of the DLASTHR and  Brothers for Life (BFL) organized crime gangs which operated in Sydney, Australia. He was featured on a short ABC Television documentary 7.30 gaving access into his former gang life. In 2016 he was found guilty of a shooting involvement where he was sentenced up to 5 years in prison.

Gang affiliations
Odisho was named at the inquest into the shooting death of Ramon Khananyah at a Fairfield, New South Wales café in November 2005. Police believed the shooting was linked to DLASTHR (The Last Hour) who Odisho was a member of. Khananyah was killed and three others wounded when three gunmen peppered the Babylon Café in the Civic Centre Arcade, Fairfield, with at least 15 bullets.

At a 2011 inquest into the death of Khananyah, Mr MacMahon said the evidence against the key police suspects was "cogent" - but not strong enough for a jury to convict them. He referred the case back to the homicide squad. No one has been charged with the murder.

At the time of the murder, Odisho was 18 years old and a member of a Fairfield gang which he said he had become involved in while still at school.

"It wasn't a gang scene," he told ABC in a short documentary he was featured on.

"We were school kids; we grew up together; later it developed into a gang sort of thing."

"I know what it looks in the public's eyes and I don't disagree with that, but when you're actually in it and you've grown up from school, it doesn't seem like a gang."
Odisho has beaten every serious charged laid against him since the shooting and won a payout for a malicious prosecution.

Brothers for Life (BFL)
While in prison, under charges later be dropped, Odisho made new friends who were associates of the Brothers for Life (BFL) gang. When he was released from prison he became the only Christian member of the group. Odisho was a senior figure of the Parramatta Chapter. In 2012, a power struggle between the founders of BFL and the gang's rival members trying to seize control of its 250,000 a week drug operation erupted into open war.

In 2013, Odisho was gunned down at his home in Winston Hills, NSW where he was shot six times in the arms and thighs. He was taken to hospital where he was operated on and survived. Police suspected Odisho could have been the victim of an internal dispute between members of the crime gang. Odisho's shooting came just days after fellow gang member Mahmoud Hamzy, 25, was shot dead by three gunmen inside the garage of his home at Revesby Heights. Two members of the gang were later charged for the shooting of Odisho, as the NSW police dismantled the gangs operations with arrests of its high-profile figures in 2014.

Imprisonment
On 9 February 2013, a BFL gang member limped into hospital with two bullets lodged in his thigh, having been shot by his own group, the victim soon cooperated with police and gave information on the gangs activity, while wearing a wired listening device, police had enough evidence to arrest two people. Odisho, and another suspect who was later granted immunity, were taken in by police and questioned about the shooting of the victim.

Using cell tower records and fingerprint evidence, prosecutors alleged that Odisho loaded the gun and handed it to the triggerman as they sat in a car at Bass Hill. Called to give evidence, the shooter corroborated this

Odisho found an unlikely ally in his victim. Unable to be identified, the man surprised the NSW District Court by saying Odisho wasn't involved in the incident, backflipping on earlier statements.

The trial had been told the person responsible for firing the weapon had been granted immunity.

“Michael has got nothing to do with nothing,” the victim told the court.

Despite his support, the jury found Odisho guilty of wounding with intent to cause grievous bodily harm and using a pistol without authorisation.

Judge David Arnott sentenced Odisho to at least three years in prison on the pistol charge and a minimum five years and eight months over the shooting itself, making him eligible for parole from November 2021.

Porsche insurance claim
On 27 September 2012, Odisho and his mother left their Winston Hills home about 10pm. Odisho alleged that when he returned home two-and-a-half hours later, the house had been ransacked and his Porsche Cayenne Turbo had been stolen, along with $3,000 in cash.

The court heard police at the time found "no signs of forced entry". It was claimed the alleged thieves stole a set of keys, took the money and drove off in the luxury car.

Odisho's Porsche vanished two and a half months after the car was purchased for $59,990 and was shortly after insured for $126,490.

Judge John Hatzistergos said on the evidence presented he "could not be sure" of the ownership of the vehicle, despite it being registered in Odisho's name, and it was "impossible to reconcile" if the inheritance Odisho used to purchase the vehicle existed. Odisho was unemployed at the time of the purchase. On 1 September 2015, Odisho lost a bid to convince the insurance company to pay him $126,000 for the Porsche.

ABC documentary
While Odisho was awaiting his trial for the shooting of a BFL member, he was featured on 7.30, an Australian nightly television current affairs program. Odisho details the life he lived since being a teenager.

Odisho's body is covered in tattoos, which taunt his police adversaries, the Middle Eastern Organised Crime Squad (MEOCS). The acronyms MEOC and POI (person of interest) are inked on his knuckles, while his neck bears the slogan, "We trust in God but just in case, keep one loaded". A tattoo of a submachine gun on his back sits under the words, "Retaliation is a must, Odisho explains the meaning of his tattoos in the short documentary, as well as the shooting he was the victim of, and his upcoming court trial.

References

Living people
Australian people of Assyrian descent
Australian organised crime figures
Gang members
Criminals from Sydney
Organised crime in Sydney
Year of birth missing (living people)